Diana Thorne (1895–1963) was an American artist and illustrator known for her drawings of dogs.

Early life and education
While Thorne is believed to have been born in Odessa, Ukraine, she often stated that she had been born in Winnipeg, Manitoba to parents who were Canadian ranchers. She studied at Imperial Academy in Munich and Charlottenburg Technical College in Berlin.

Career
Her work is included in the collections of the Smithsonian American Art Museum, the American Museum and Gardens, Bath, England, 
and the McNay Art Museum.

Books
Diana Thorne's Dog-Basket, A Series of Etchings (1930)
Your Dogs and Mine (1932)
Around the World with Children and Dogs (1940)
Drawing Dogs (1940)
Dogs: An Album of Drawings (1944)
How to Draw the Dog: A Technical Treatise (1950)

References

1895 births
1965 deaths
20th-century American women artists
American women illustrators
German emigrants to the United States